The Iron Heart is a lost 1917 silent film drama directed by George Fitzmaurice. It was produced by Astra Film Company and distributed by Pathé Exchange.

Cast
 Edwin Arden - Stephen Martin
 Forrest Winant - Tom Martin
 Helene Chadwick - Grace
 Leonore Harris - Anne Parbell
 Gertrude Berkeley - Mrs. Martin

References

External links
 The Iron Heart at IMDb.com

1917 films
American silent feature films
Lost American films
American black-and-white films
Pathé Exchange films
Films directed by George Fitzmaurice
Silent American drama films
1917 drama films
1917 lost films
Lost drama films
1910s American films
1910s English-language films